Christopher McDermott (born 7 June 1989) is a British handball player. He competed as part of Team GB at the 2012 London Olympic Games. He currently coaches the GB Men's Under 20s. Past clubs include R.D. Slovan of Slovenia, Danish Liga side Aarhus G.F. and German Bundasliga side TUSEM Essen. In June 2015 he became the Great Britain handball team's most capped player, surpassing Mick Hegarty's long standing record of 55 caps set in the 1980s.

Bio

Having played for Wirral Handball Club since the age of 10, Christopher was selected at the age of 16 to move to Denmark as part of the GB Handball teams centralized program. After progressing through the ranks of Danish youth club Handball Christopher was granted a move to Germany to play for TUSEM Essen. He has since played for Aarhus GF Håndbold, RD Slovan, Afturelding and Salford H.C. (Now known as Warrington Wolves)

In May 2012 Christopher was selected for the London 2012 Summer Olympics. Injuries nearly prevented him from doing so, with the player suffering a ruptured muscle the day before the opening ceremony. He managed to play through the injury and proceeded to play a big part in each of Team GB's matches at the games. Team GB competed against France, Sweden, Argentina, Tunisia and Iceland, where GB were unable to record a win despite having risen dramatically through the world rankings, aided by more funding than usual, enabling them to build a platform.  In reality, winning against one of the world's top teams had always been an extremely tall order (despite running silver medallists Iceland very close until half time) and the real purpose of the efforts of the squad was to build a base for handball to develop in the UK.

In this he and his team mates were successful, and handball remains a legacy sport of London 2012, recording significant, sustained expansion in the period since. 

Post 2012, McDermott and his Warrington Wolves teammates have broken the historic stranglehold overseas ex-pat players had previously enjoyed in British Leagues and with a team made up wholly of British young players now dominate the English Handball Premier League with successive League and Cup doubles and victory in the British Cup making up a historic treble.

References

External links
 Team GB Profile
 British Handball Association
 English Handball Association
 Telegraph - Team GB
 Idraetshojskolen i Aarhus
 British Handball Blog - Christopher McDermott
 Handball News
 TUSEM Essen News
 Sports Works - Handball
 MBL - Sports
 Afturelding Handball Club
 Sports News Iceland

British male handball players
1989 births
Living people
Expatriate handball players
Sportspeople from Birkenhead
Handball players at the 2012 Summer Olympics
Olympic handball players of Great Britain
Ungmennafélagið Afturelding
English expatriate sportspeople in Iceland
English expatriate sportspeople in Slovenia
English expatriate sportspeople in Denmark
English expatriate sportspeople in Germany